Lego Fabuland is a defunct theme and product range of the Lego construction toy, aimed at young children. Introduced in 1979, the range aimed to fill the gap between Duplo and the standard Lego product ranges. Aimed at both boys and girls, the range encouraged storytelling, and was the first theme to be extended into books, clothing, and a claymation children's television show, Edward and Friends, that aired in the UK and Canada during the 1980s. Each episode was five minutes in length.

Characters
Fabuland sets featured anthropomorphic animal characters. These pieces were larger than standard Lego Minifigures, but smaller than Duplo figures, and included movable arms, legs and head. Some of the characters appeared in more than one set, and were given names, and sometimes even stories. Recurring characters included Edward Elephant, Bonnie Bunny, Max Mouse, Clive Crocodile, Walter (Wilfred) Walrus, Wally Walrus, Lucy Lamb, Lisa Lamb, Ricky Raccoon, Roger Raccoon, Freddy Fox, Bruno Bear, Bernard Bear, Billy Bear, Perry Panda, Patrick Panda, Bertie Bulldog, Boris Bulldog, Buster Bulldog, Barty Bulldog, Clarke Bulldog, Mike Monkey, Mark Monkey, Gabriel Gorilla (Chester Chimp), Paulette Poodle, Harry Horse, Henry Horse, Catherine Cat, Charlie Cat, Sandy Seagull, Lionel Lion, Legal Beagle, Hannah Hippopotamus, Joe Crow, Marjorie Mouse, Mortimer Mouse, Michael Mouse, Patricia Piglet, Patrick Pig, Percy Pig, Peter Pig, Hugo Hog, Billy Goat, Gertrude Goat, Clara Cow, Doctor Dog, Paul Parrot, Robby Rabbit, Bert Bear and Ernie Elephant. This was the first Lego theme where characters had names. In different countries names of the same characters were different.

Style
Fabuland had a distinctive friendly style with various animal characters that each had a job or purpose in the town of Fabuland. Fabuland featured special elements that were larger than standard Lego bricks, but were fully compatible with regular Lego. Fabuland used a primary colour scheme and the sets were aimed for children between 4-8 as a transition from Duplo to Lego. Fabuland was unique due to the special elements, such as walls, roof elements, tables, chairs, boats and cars chassis. Larger Sets included buildings with story book like instructions and the theme also had many vehicles and individual characters with accessories. Fabuland is highly sought after today among collectors and there is a large fan base that keeps the theme alive via Lego fan sites.

Fabuland was discontinued in 1989 and since then many elements have reappeared in many themes. In 2000, Lego released the Mickey Mouse theme that contained many Fabuland elements. Fabuland elements have appeared in Harry Potter, Belville, Castle/Kingdoms, Friends and Lego Games and others. The Fabuland line was referenced in the 2014 film The Lego Movie.

Sets

Books
Instructions for sets contained text stories with illustrations. This was the first time Lego used inspirational material. There were also printed story books based on Lego Fabuland theme. These include Edward's Skyscraper, The Missing Fireworks, Catherine Cat's Birthday, Billy Bear's Holiday, Ricky at the Restaurant, Charlie Cat's Flying Circus, Lionel Lion's New Car, Morty's New Job, Henry's Night Out, The Flower Song, Edward's Butterfly, The Birthday Present, The Burblies, The Troll in the Mountain, The Fabuland Rainbow (released with a poster and a vinyl record), Max & Edward All At Sea, Adventure in the Dark, The Red Ball, The Whirlwind, The Snowstorm, The Secret Trip, Edward Elephant, Bonnie Bunny, Lionel Lion, Boris Bulldog, Marjorie Mouse, Mortimer Mouse, Doctor Dog, Freddy Fox, Gertrude Goat, Catherine Cat, Doctor Lucy Lamb, Barty Bulldog, Henry Horse, Paul Parrot, Billy Bear, Hannah Hippopotamus. Additionally seven books were released, based on Fabuland TV series "Edward and Friends". The comic strip "Fabuland, the Country of Fantasies" was included in the Italian magazine Più e il suo Gioco.

Other products
For the Fabuland theme Lego introduced such licensed products as key chains, table decorations, pens, playing cards, jigsaw puzzles, memory games (in association with Ravensburger), parachute toys, children cutlery sets (in association with BSF), bed cover sheets, children's clothing. Fabuland characters were attached to Nestlé's Orzoro jars. In 1979 in Germany Phonogram Inc. released on vinyl record radioplay "Stories from Fabuland" written by Sebastian Beck and directed by Michael Weckler.

External links
Fabuland on Brickset.

Notes

Fabuland
Toy animals
Products introduced in 1979
Products and services discontinued in 1989